Gala Supreme (1969−1994) was an Australian thoroughbred racehorse who won the 1973 Melbourne Cup.

Racing career
Having run second in the Caulfield Cup to the Swell Time, he overcame a wide barrier (24) to defeat the 5/2 race favorite Glengowan by half-a-length.

Throughout his career, he accumulated 40 starts, 7 wins, 6 places, 8 shows and total career earnings of $181,300.

Gala Supreme was ridden by Frank Reys the first jockey of confirmed Aboriginal descent to win the Melbourne Cup.

References

Melbourne Cup winners
1969 racehorse births
1994 racehorse deaths
Thoroughbred family C5
Racehorses bred in Australia
Racehorses trained in Australia